Sydney Carter. (born November 18, 1990) is a retired professional basketball player.  She played college basketball at Texas A&M University, where she played along Sydney Colson and San Antonio Stars center Danielle Adams and helped the Aggies win the NCAA title during her junior year. She was an Assistant Coach in the 2021-2022 season at Texas A&M and is now the Director of Player Delevopment for women’s basketball at The University of Texas.

Texas A&M statistics

Source

WNBA
Sidney Carter was selected in the third round of the 2012 WNBA Draft (28th overall) by the Chicago Sky.
On March 18, 2013, Carter signed a training camp contract with the Atlanta Dream, but was cut before the start of the regular season.
On June 10, 2013, Carter signed with the Connecticut Sun.

References

External links
 Sydney Carter Bio

1990 births
Living people
American women's basketball players
Atlanta Dream players
Basketball players from Dallas
Chicago Sky draft picks
Chicago Sky players
Connecticut Sun players
Indiana Fever players
Point guards
Texas A&M Aggies women's basketball players